"So Called Life" is a single by the Canadian rock band Three Days Grace. It was released on November 29, 2021 as the lead single from the band's seventh studio album Explosions. The song was available digitally on music streaming services on December 1, 2021. "So Called Life" was the most played song on rock radio in 2022.

Composition and lyrics
"So Called Life" has been described by critics as a hard rock song. The track runs at 160 BPM and is in the key of D major. It runs for three minutes and 26 seconds. The song was written by Matt Walst, Brad Walst, Barry Stock, Neil Sanderson and Ted Bruner while Howard Benson handled the production of the song. The song was written around March 2020 and according to bassist Brad Walst, the song was originally suppose to be a "cool kind of party song." Brad Walst spoke about "So Called Life" in an interview with Jave Patterson of Two Doods Reviews explaining about how the song was written.

Music video
The music video for "So Called Life" premiered on November 29, 2021 and it was directed by Jon Vulpine.
Speaking about the music video, director Jon Vulpine explained how the video came together.

As of November 2022, the music video for "So Called Life" has over 10 million views on YouTube.

Chart performance
"So Called Life" debuted on the Canada Rock chart at number 41 and later peaked at number 7 on the chart. The song also reached the Billboard Mainstream Rock chart at number one, topping the chart for four consectutive weeks, and on the Hot Rock & Alternative Songs chart at number 29. This marks the band's 16th number-one song on the Mainstream Rock Airplay chart, tying the record for the most number-ones with Shinedown and earned 796,000 streams in the US. It also peaked at number 11 on the Alternative Digital Song Sales chart.

Charts

Weekly charts

Year-end charts

Awards and nominations

Release history

References

2021 songs
2021 singles
Three Days Grace songs
RCA Records singles
Song recordings produced by Howard Benson
Songs written by Barry Stock
Songs written by Neil Sanderson
Songs written by Ted Bruner
Songs about the COVID-19 pandemic